This is a list of people who have served as Lord Lieutenant of Carlow.

There were lieutenants of counties in Ireland until the reign of James II, when they were renamed governors. The office of Lord Lieutenant was recreated on 23 August 1831.

Governors

 Dudley Bagenal 1689–1690 (Jacobite)
 Sir Thomas Butler, 3rd Baronet 1699–
 Henry O'Brien, 8th Earl of Thomond 1714–1741 
 Sir Thomas Burdett, 1st Baronet, of Dunmore 1725–1727
 William Burton 1741– 
 Beauchamp Bagenal 1767–1800
 Clement Wolseley
 William Henry Burton 1767–1800
 John Staunton Rochfort: 1779–1798 –1831
 David La Touche: 1798–1816
 William Browne: –1831
 Henry Bruen: 1816–1831
 The Lord Downes: 1820–1831
 Thomas Kavanagh: –1831

Lord Lieutenants
 The 4th Earl of Bessborough: 17 October 1831 – 1838
 The 5th Earl of Bessborough: November 1838 – 28 January 1880
 Arthur MacMorrough Kavanagh: 25 March 1880 – 25 December 1889
 The 2nd Baron Rathdonnell: 26 February 1890 – 1922

References

Carlow